The Delhi Capitals are a franchise cricket team based in Delhi, India, and are one of the teams participating in the Indian Premier League (IPL). The Capitals played their first match in the first season of the IPL against the Rajasthan Royals. The Capitals reached the IPL playoffs three times, and have topped the group stage table twice. Their performances in the competition have resulted in their qualification for the 2009 and 2012 Champions League Twenty20, in which they reached the semi-finals on the second occasion. In total, 108 players have played for the Capitals, of whom Virender Sehwag has played the most matches: 86 since his debut for the franchise in 2008.

The leading run-scorer for the Capitals is Sehwag with 2,382 runs. Rishabh Pant's innings of 128 not out against the Sunrisers Hyderabad in 2018 is the highest individual score in an innings by a Capitals batsman. David Warner and Shikhar Dhawan both have scored two centuries each for the Capitals, whereas Sehwag, AB de Villiers, Kevin Pietersen, Quinton de Kock, Sanju Samson, and Pant have scored one each. JP Duminy has the team's best batting average: 44.13. Among Capitals's bowlers, Amit Mishra has taken more wickets than any other, with 90. The best bowling average is Doug Bracewell's 10.66, though among bowlers who have bowled more than 20 overs, Farveez Maharoof has the best average with 19.25. Mishra has the best bowling figures in an innings: he got a five wicket haul against the Deccan Chargers in a 2008 match, while conceding only 17 runs. Dinesh Karthik has taken the most catches as wicket-keeper for the Capitals, with 30, while also making the most stumpings: 15. Sehwag has claimed the highest number of catches among fielders, taking 30.

Players

Key
  – Member of the current squad
  – Captain
  – Wicket-keeper
 First – Year of Twenty20 debut for the Capitals
 Last – Year of latest Twenty20 match for the Capitals
 * – Batsman remained not out

Statistics are correct as of the Capitals's match against the Mumbai Indians at Feroz Shah Kotla Ground, Delhi, 2018 IPL, 20 May 2018.
These statistics do not cover practice matches or matches abandoned without a toss.

Captains

Key
 First – Year of first match captained for the Capitals
 Last – Year of latest match captained for the Capitals

Statistics are correct as of the Capitals's match against the Mumbai Indians at Feroz Shah Kotla Ground, Delhi, 2018 IPL, 20 May 2018.
These statistics do not cover practice matches or matches abandoned without a toss.

See also

GMR Group
Munday Dilli ke

Notes

Footnotes

References

External links
Official website of Delhi Daredevils

Cricket
Delhi Capitals